Rașcov  (Romanian; alternative names Râșcov, Rașcu; in , Rashkiv, Rashkovo, Polish Raszków) is one of the oldest communes of Transnistria. It is located in the northern part, between Rîbnița and Camenca. It is composed of two villages, Iantarnoe (Янтарне, Янтарное) and Rașcov.

History
Rașcov village was founded in 1402 as a trading post on the Dniester river. Some maintain that the name derives from the Romanian term for Lactarius deliciosus, a variety of mushroom. However, there are a number of settlements across Poland and Ukraine with the same name, casting doubt on this claim. Rashkov is also a Bulgarian male surname.

One of the oldest villages of Transnistria, it is known for having been home in the past to a significant Polish population. From the 15th century, all of northern Transnistria was part of the Grand Duchy of Lithuania, and later to the Polish Crown in the Polish–Lithuanian Commonwealth (1569–1793) which encouraged the migration of peasants into the territory from neighboring populated areas (from north and from west).

During the Middle Ages, the village hosted one of seven major fairs for the Dniester-Southern Bug area (the others being Mohuliv, Dubăsari, Yampil, Silibria, Yaruga, and Vasilcău). Before becoming part of the Russian Empire in 1793 during the second partition of Poland, the largest groups living between the Dniester and the Bug rivers were Moldavian, Ruthenian (Ukrainian) and Tatar peasants.

Hasidic history
Raşcov was the residence for Rabbi Jacob Joseph of Polonne, a leading Jewish Hasidic tzaddik and one of the first of the disciples of the founder of Hasidic Judaism, the Baal Shem Tov. His book, Toldos Yaacov Yosef, (published on 1780), was the first chassidic work ever published. In it repeats the phrase, "I have heard from my teacher", 249 times. He is one of the foremost sources for teachings from the Baal Shem Tov. Reb Yaacov Yosef was also somewhat known for his abrupt temperament, yet his teachings on the Zaddik, the saint-mystic and holy leader, provide an example of attainment of the highest degree of spiritual solitude, while also exemplifying the piety of a respected leader at the center of the community.

Rabbi Jacob Joseph came to Raşcov as a result of his exile from Shargorod. Having been the rabbi of Shargorod for several years, Rabbi Jacob Joseph was expelled from his position in Shargorod on a Friday afternoon in 1748. In several of his responsa, which he wrote in Raşcov, he reveals the suffering which he had undergone. He would later leave Raşcov after being appointed rabbi in Nemirov, a center of Hasidism, where he practiced daily fasting for five years, until the Besht came upon him.

The family continued to have a presence in the local Jewish community, as Rabbi Jacob Joseph's son was Rabbi Samson of Raszkow.

Historic sites
Rașcov and the surrounding area is home to numerous historic monuments and architecture, among them the Polish Roman Catholic Saint Cajetan Church, considered a historical heritage. It has recently undergone extensive renovation.
The church was built when this part of Transnistria was a part of the Crown of the Polish Kingdom, with generous contributions by the Moldavian prince Petru Rareş.

Landscape
Outside Rașcov is located the Rascov National Park, an extensive natural landscape preserve,
and an ecologically protected area.

More recently, the Transnistrian separatist authorities have edited an Atlas of Pridnestrovie, which refers to the area around Rașcov as the "Pridnestrovian Alps": Time, wind, and water have eroded the abrupt slopes near the village of Rashkov, having formed the limestone outliers, towering above the slopes.

References

External links 
 Northern PMR

Communes of Transnistria
1402 establishments in Europe
Populated places established in the 1400s
Bratslav Voivodeship
Olgopolsky Uyezd
Camenca District